Susa is an ancient city of the Elamite, Persian and Parthian empires of Iran, located in the lower Zagros Mountains.

Susa may also refer to:

Geographical

Settlements
Susa, Piedmont, an Italian city and commune in the Piedmont region
Shush, Iran, a modern city near ancient Susa
Susa, Cundinamarca, a Colombian municipality and town in the Cundinamarca Department
Susa, Libya, a Libyan town and seaside resort in the Jabal al Akhdar District
Susa or Sūsa, the Berber spelling of Sousse, a Tunisian city in the Sousse Governorate

Other geographical
Shush County, an administrative subdivision of Iran
March of Susa, an alternate name for the March of Turin, a march (territory) covering Susa that was subordinated into the House of Savoy
Susa Point, southern Atlantic
Susa Valley, an Italian valley in the Piedmont region

Other uses
Conrad Susa (born 1935), American composer
Susa, the nickname for Jesusa Cruz Avilés, a fictional character who is part of the Puerto Rican comedy duo Susa y Epifanio
 SUSA, the Scottish University Sailing Association

See also
Suså (disambiguation)
Sousa (disambiguation)